"No More Love" is a song by the band God Lives Underwater. It was originally released on their self-titled EP album God Lives Underwater in 1995, resulting in significant airplay. The song was featured in the 1995 movie Johnny Mnemonic.

Track listing
 No More Love - Rock Mix (3:26) 
 No More Love - Edit (3:21) 
 No More Love - LP Version (4:16)

Music video
Clark Eddy directed the first music video. It features the band playing outside around a nuclear power plant with smoke stacks burning, suggesting they are playing during a nuclear meltdown. The music video was featured in the PlayStation game Slamscape.

A second video was filmed as a tie-in to Johnny Mnemonic.  It features footage of the band performing, intercut with footage from the film.

External links
 https://www.youtube.com/watch?v=GN659FUswZg

God Lives Underwater songs
1998 singles
Song recordings produced by Rick Rubin
1995 songs
American Recordings (record label) singles